Aide et Action International South Asia provides support to local actors for the implementation of their projects on diverse programmes related to education, early childhood care and education, Livelihood Education for excluded youth from poor and marginalized sections, health, environment, social cohesion, inclusion of the girl child, etc. The Aide et Action Network ensures perfect and total transparency about the use of funds received to its sponsors, donors and partners, by publishing its financial statements each year, accessible to all on the Internet.

History 
Aide et Action was established in France in 1981 by Pierre-Bernard Le Bas. India was its first country program. In 2007, the Aide et Action transformed into Aide et Action International. In 2010,  Aide et Action South Asia evolved along with Aide et Action Africa (2010) followed by Aide et Action South East Asia and Latin America-Caribbean (2011). The Aide et Action South Asia operates in India, Sri Lanka, Nepal and Bhutan with its Head Office located in Chennai and supported by 9 sub-regional offices in Bhopal, Chennai, Delhi, Guwahati, Hyderabad, Jaipur, Patna, Katmandu and Colombo. Aide et Action South Asia implements 39 projects, along with support of institutions, government and individual sponsors. Through its 39 projects, Aide et Action South Asia, contributes to the improvement of the access and quality of education for nearly 7,31,000 children and adults. 72 employees and 250 project staff across the South Asia region take part in implementing its educational mission.

The nine thematic intervention 
 Access and Quality Education
 Early Childhood Care & Education(all activities that promote development of the child from 0–6 years)
 Women Empowerment & Education
 Inclusive education
 Education for Global Citizenship 
 Livelihood education
 Health Education 
 Education for Migrating population
 Disaster Response, Mitigation and Preparedness

Achievements 
The education for Tribal Girls in Odisha, an initiative of Aide et Action has been selected as one of the best practices by United Nations Girl Education Initiative in 2014. The project has been selected for the best practices adopted to arrest school drop outs rates in the area.

Aide et Action played an active role in developing customized social protection products and services for Internal migrants in India.

iLEAD (Initiative for  Livelihood Education and Development) is a flagship programme of Aide et Action which has provided livelihood education to 1, 33, 487 youth out of which 75% of whom have been placed.

References 

South Asia
Educational organizations